The Ness of Burgi fort is an iron-age promontory fort in the Old Scatness archaeological site on the Ness of Burgi, a narrow finger of land reaching south from the Scat Ness in the far south of the island of Mainland, Shetland in Scotland.

Location

The fort is on a rocky promontory on the east side of the Ness and is open to the public at all times.

Structure

The blockhouse, probably built about 100 BC seems to be excessively large for the area that it protects, and so was perhaps more designed to impress rather than to defend.
The blockhouse structure seems to have been built as an integral part of the defensive wall.
The walls do not reach the edges of the cliffs on either side.
There is no evidence that they once reached further and since have been shortened through natural or human activity.
The ends are properly finished. It seems that the gaps were deliberate, and defense was not a primary concern.  
In fact, there are other points on the promontory that provide equally good natural defensive positions.

There may be some similarity in this incomplete defensive wall with the forework of the Broch of Clickimin, the Huxter Fort and the Crosskirk Broch.
These works may be seen as prototypes that evolved into the brochs that were later built in the islands and the Scottish and Irish mainlands.

Gallery

Notes and references
Citations

Sources

Promontory forts in Scotland
Archaeological sites in Shetland
Historic Scotland properties in Shetland
Scheduled monuments in Scotland
Mainland, Shetland
Buildings and structures completed in the 2nd century BC